Ahmadabad (also Romanized as Sardarabad) is a village in Mahdasht Rural District, Mahdasht District, Sardarabad County, Alborz Province, Iran. At the 2006 census, its population was 261, in 60 families.

References 

Populated places in Nazarabad County